Hamburg School District may refer to a school district in the United States:

Hamburg School District (Arkansas)
Hamburg Community School District (Iowa)
Hamburg School District (New Jersey)
Hamburg Central School District (New York)